Adrian Chama (born 18 March 1989) is a Zambian footballer who plays for ZESCO United and the Zambia national team.

International career
Chama made his senior international debut on 6 June 2014 in a 4-3 friendly defeat to Japan, coming on as an 88th minute substitute for Jimmy Chisenga.

References

External links 
 
 
 

1989 births
Living people
Zambian footballers
Zambia international footballers
Association football defenders
Green Buffaloes F.C. players
ZESCO United F.C. players
People from Mufulira
Zambia Super League players
Zambia A' international footballers
2016 African Nations Championship players
2018 African Nations Championship players
2020 African Nations Championship players